The 16th World Cup season began in December 1981 in France and concluded in March 1982, also in France. Phil Mahre of the US repeated as overall champion, the second of his three consecutive titles. Erika Hess of Switzerland won the women's overall title.

A break in the schedule was for the 1982 World Championships, held in Schladming, Austria, between January 28 and February 7, 1982.  The women's races were held in Haus im Ennstal.

Calendar

Men

Ladies

Men

Overall 

see complete table

For the 1982 overall title, the best five downhills, best five giant slaloms, best five slaloms and best three combined counted. Thirty racers had a point deduction.

Downhill 

see complete table

The same tie-breaking rule in effect in 1977 (which awarded Heini Hemmi a discipline title over Ingemar Stenmark) were still in effect—best sixth score. Thus, Canada's Steve Podborski was awarded the season title and discipline trophy over two-time winner Peter Müller by having a better sixth score (12, for a fourth-place finish, compared to 10, for a sixth-place finish).

Giant Slalom 

see complete table

Phil Mahre won the cup with only one win.

Slalom 

see complete table

Combined 

see complete table

In Men's Combined World Cup 1981/82 all 5 results count. Phil Mahre won his third Combined World Cup in a row.

Ladies

Overall 

see complete table

In Women's Overall World Cup 1981/82 the best five downhills, best five giant slaloms, best five slaloms and best three combined count. 25 racers had a point deduction.

Downhill 

see complete table

In Women's Downhill World Cup 1981/82 the best 5 results count. Only four different venues in two different countries. Marie-Cécile Gros-Gaudenier won the cup with only one win.

Giant Slalom 

see complete table

In Women's Giant Slalom World Cup 1981/82 the best 5 results count. The Epple-sisters won 7 races out of 9!

Slalom 

see complete table

Erika Hess won five races. She won the World Cup with maximum points.

Combined 

see complete table

In Women's Combined World Cup 1981/82 all 4 results count.

Nations Cup

Overall

Men

Ladies

References

External links
FIS-ski.com - World Cup standings - 1982

FIS Alpine Ski World Cup
World Cup
World Cup